Big Shale Hill is located on the border of Alberta and British Columbia. The name is thought to come from the thick layer of shale on the mountain.

See also
List of peaks on the Alberta–British Columbia border
Mountains of Alberta
Mountains of British Columbia

References

Big Shale Hill
Big Shale Hill
Canadian Rockies